Ulleripattu is a revenue village in Cuddalore district, state of Tamil Nadu, India.

External links 
 Official website of Cuddalore District
 Official website of Tamil Nadu
 Government of Tamil Nadu

References 

Villages in Cuddalore district
Cities and villages in Cuddalore taluk